Clarence Barlow (also Klarenz, born 27 December 1945) is a composer of classical and electroacoustic works.

Career
Barlow was one of the founders of Initiative Musik und Informatik Köln. In 1988 he was the director of music at the International Computer Music Conference in Cologne. From 1990 to 1994, Barlow was the artistic director of the Institute of Sonology, at the Royal Conservatory of The Hague, where he also taught in the composition department.

Barlow was the Corwin Endowed Chair and head of composition at University of California, Santa Barbara’s Music Department from 2006 to 2019.

Compositional style and techniques
Barlow prefers traditional instrumental timbres to electronically synthesized ones because "they sound so much more alive and exciting". Although for this reason most of his works have been written for traditional instruments, he has frequently used the computer to generate the structures of his works. His comprehensive theory of tonality and metrics was first tested in the piano work Çoǧluotobüsişletmesi (1975–79). Spectral analysis and instrumental resynthesis of human speech has also played an important role in his compositions.

References

Sources

Further reading
 Clarence Barlow, International Artist Database
 Clements, Dominy. 2009. "Clarence Barlow—Interview". MusicWeb International (9 February) (Accessed 22 January 2010).
 Manion, M[ichael]. 2004. "Gimik: Initiative Musik und Informatik Köln r. V.". Cologne: Gimik e. V. (Accessed 22 January 2010).
 Toop, Richard. 2008. "Kulturelle Dissidenten: Die Stockhausen-Klasse der Jahre 1973 und 1974". MusikTexte: Zeitschrift für neue Musik, no. 116 (February): 46–49.

External links

Clarence Barlow's Website at UCSB, Department of Music (archive from 17 December 2016, accessed 3 June 2020)
AUTOBUSK – Barlow's "Pitch and Rhythm Generator" software
Clarence Barlow, at P-ART
Interview with Clarence Barlow by Bob Gilmore (2007) in Paris Transatlantic Magazine
Interview with Musicweb International
"Klarenz Barlow" details, feedback studio verlag (in German)

1945 births
Living people
21st-century classical composers
20th-century classical composers
University of Calcutta alumni
British classical composers
British male classical composers
British music educators
Utrecht University alumni
University of California, Santa Barbara faculty
Academic staff of the Royal Conservatory of The Hague
Pupils of Karlheinz Stockhausen
20th-century British composers
Musicians from Kolkata
20th-century British male musicians
20th-century British musicians
21st-century British male musicians